Dubrovka is a settlement in Bryansk Oblast, Russia. Population: 

The town is located on Sesche on the river, a tributary of the Desna River. Railway station is located on the Bryansk-Smolensk line, 81 kilometers north-west of Bryansk.

History
The settlement was founded in 1868 in connection with the construction of the Oryol-Vitebsk railroad (the station was named after a nearby village). In the 1880s there were industries including distillery, sawmill, mills, churns. In 1912, twine factory was built.

In 1929 it became the district center and in 1931 it was granted an urban-type settlement status.

In 2012 its status was demoted to 'settlement'.

References

Urban-type settlements in Bryansk Oblast
Oryol Governorate